Evin Incir (born 15 June 1984) is a Swedish politician of Kurdish descent for the Swedish Social Democratic Party. She was voted into the European Parliament in 2019.

Political career
Born on 15 June 1984 in Diyarbakir, Turkey, Incir has been serving on the Committee on Civil Liberties, Justice and Home Affairs since 2019. In addition to her committee assignments, Incir has been part of the Parliament's delegations to the EU-Turkey Joint Parliamentary Committee since 2019 and to the Euro-Mediterranean Parliamentary Assembly since 2021. She is also a member of the European Parliament Anti-Racism and Diversity Intergroup, the European Parliament Intergroup on LGBT Rights, the European Parliament Intergroup on Trade Unions and the European Parliament Intergroup on Western Sahara.

Recognition
In December 2020, Incir received the Best Newcomer award at The Parliament Magazine'''s annual MEP Awards.

In June 2022 Incir won the award for diversity, inclusion and social impact at The Parliament Magazine'''s annual MEP Awards.

References 

Living people
1984 births
MEPs for Sweden 2019–2024
Swedish people of Kurdish descent